Mutton usually refers to sheep meat.

Mutton may also refer to:

Places
 Mutton Bird Island, an irregularly shaped island in south-eastern Australia
 Mutton Brook, a stream that runs between East Finchley and Hendon in the Borough of Barnet, London, England

People
 Mutton (surname)

Arts, entertainment, and media
 Mutton, a 2012 novel by India Knight
 Mutton Birds, a band from New Zealand

Other uses
 Mutton busting, an event for children held at rodeos similar to bronc riding
 Mutton chops (sideburns), patches of facial hair grown on the sides of the face
 "Mutton quad" (em quad), a space of 1 em width in typography
 Mutton snapper, a species of fish
 "Mutton", used interchangeably with "goat meat" in some Asian and Indian cooking

See also 
 Muttonbird (disambiguation)
 Muttonbirding, the seasonal harvesting of the chicks of petrels for food, oil and feathers